The Millmerran railway line is a 71 kilometre long branch railway in the Darling Downs region of Queensland, Australia.

History

The Queensland Parliament approved a railway line to link Pittsworth with the east via the Southern railway line from Toowoomba in October 1885.  

The line branches off the Southern line in the township of Wyreema (then called Beauaraba) 17 km south of the major regional city of Toowoomba and opened on 19 September 1887. The Southern line branched from Gowrie Junction until the opening of the Drayton Deviation from Toowoomba direct to Wyreema in 1915.

Stops were constructed en route to Pittsworth at The Hollows, Umbiram, Southbrook, Greenhills and Broxburn.

An extension to the agricultural centre of Millmerran via Murlaggan, Yarranlea, Cecilvale, Brookstead, Pampas and Yandilla was approved in November 1909 and opened for business on 18 October 1911. Much of the line closely parallels the Gore Highway.

Grain traffic was substantial and has been the branch lifeblood all along. A rail motor service operated between 1928 and 1969. As occurred elsewhere, road transport took over much of the business with the result that only spasmodic grain transport remains.

The line was closed following the 2010–11 Queensland floods. American operator Watco began operating grain trains to and from Brookstead in April 2022 on behalf of GrainCorp.

The line was laid with 30kg/m rail with an axle load of 15.75 tonnes. The maximum grade is 1 in 50 (2%) and the minimum radius curves are 160m. The line speed is 50km/h to Brookstead, and was 30km/h beyond.

See also

 Rail transport in Queensland

References

 "

External links
 1925 map of the Queensland railway system
 

Railway lines in Queensland
Railway lines opened in 1897
Toowoomba Region
1897 establishments in Australia